Aubin blanc (or simply Aubin) is a white wine grape from the upper reaches of the Moselle valley in eastern France.

History
DNA fingerprinting has shown that Aubin is the result of a cross between Gouais blanc and Savagnin. Gouais blanc was widely grown by the French peasantry in the Medieval age, and it is a parent of Chardonnay and Aubin vert among others. Savagnin is common in Jura wine (including Vin jaune) and is a variety in the Traminer family which also includes Gewürztraminer.

Viticulture
There's usually a reason why grapes like this are in decline. The Traminer family are notoriously difficult to grow, with poor disease resistance and low yields.

Wine regions
Aubin blanc is only found blended into wines from the Côtes de Toul appellation in Lorraine.

Synonyms
Albin Blanc, Aneb ben Cadi, Aubin, Blanc de Magny, Gros Vert de Crenay

See also
 Toul, the grape's home town

References

White wine grape varieties
French wine